Solar power in Indiana has been growing in recent years due to new technological improvements and a variety of regulatory actions and financial incentives, particularly a 30% federal tax credit for any size project.

In 2015, Indiana ranked 18th among U.S. states for installed solar power with 136 MW of photovoltaic panels. An estimated 18% of electricity in Indiana could be provided by rooftop solar panels. 

In 2011, Indiana's largest solar installation was the six acre array located on the roof of the Maj. Gen. Emmett J. Bean Federal Center in Lawrence, Indiana, capable of generating a peak power of over 2 MW. A 17.5MW plant built at the Indianapolis airport in 2013 was the largest airport solar farm in the U.S. A 9MW solar farm was built at the Indianapolis Motor Speedway in 2014. The 3.2MW Rockville Solar II is the largest solar roof installation in the state.

The Mammoth Solar project in Northwest Indiana broke ground in October 2021, and when complete it will be the largest solar project in the United States, with more than 2.8 million panels producing more than 1 gigawatt of power.

Government policy
The Government of Indiana has taken a variety of actions in order to encourage solar energy use within the state.

Net metering
The state has a net metering program that allows installations of up to 1 MW of on-site electrical generation to continuously roll over any excess generation to the next month. Participation is limited to 1% of utilities most recent peak summer demand. Peak summer demand for the state for 2011 was 20,251 MW.

Feed In Tariff
Indiana's Northern Indiana Public Service Company, NIPSCO, offers a feed-in tariff of $0.30/kWh for systems from 5 to 10 kW, and $0.26/kWh for systems from 10 kW to 2 MW. AES Indiana has a Renewable Energy Production program that pays $0.24/kWh for solar from 20 kW to 100 kW and $0.20/kWh for solar arrays of from 100 kW to 10 MW. Payments are for 15 years, participation is limited, and one third of the program, 45,900 MWh/year, will be made available through a reverse auction. No new applications will be accepted beyond March 2013.

Indiana Solar Energy Working Group
The Indiana Office of Energy Development has created the Indiana Solar Energy Working Group to promote the development of solar energy, including local manufacturing.

Statistics

Installed capacity

Utility-scale generation

See also

Wind power in Indiana
Solar power in the United States
Renewable energy in the United States

References

External links
Incentives and policies
Indiana Renewable Energy Society

Indiana
Economy of Indiana